"Backroads" is a song written by Canadian country music artist Charlie Major, and recorded by American country music singer Ricky Van Shelton.  It was released in March 1992 as the fourth single and title track from his album Backroads.  It had previously served as the b-side to that album's earlier single "I Am a Simple Man."

Major won SOCAN Song of the Year at the 1993 Canadian Country Music Association Awards. He later recorded the song on his 2004 album Inside Out.

Chart performance
"Backroads" spent twenty weeks on the Hot Country Songs charts, peaking at #2 for one week. It also reached #3 on the Canadian country music charts published by RPM.

Year-end charts

References

1990 songs
1992 singles
Ricky Van Shelton songs
Songs written by Charlie Major
Song recordings produced by Steve Buckingham (record producer)
Columbia Nashville Records singles
Canadian Country Music Association Song of the Year songs